José Ignacio "Nacho" Rodilla Gil (born 12 March 1974) is a former Spanish professional basketball player. Standing at 192 cm (6 ft 4 in), Rodilla used to play as point guard. His jersey number 11 was retired by Valencia Basket. Rodilla was also a member of the Spain national basketball team.

References

1974 births
Living people
Point guards
S.S. Felice Scandone players
Spanish men's basketball players
Valencia Basket players
Virtus Bologna players